Hei is the Norwegian word for "Hi" or "Hello". It is less formal than for example "God Dag" Which means Good Day.
It may also refer to:

Companies and organizations
 HEI Hospitality, an American hotel owner and operator
 Hawaiian Electric Industries, the largest supplier of electricity in the state of Hawaii
 Health Effects Institute, a non-profit focused on the health effects of air pollution
 HEICO, HEI is the stock symbol for HEICO Corporation

In education 
 Higher education institution
 Graduate Institute of International and Development Studies, in Geneva, Switzerland
 Hautes études d'ingénieur, an engineering school in Lille, France

In language
 He (letter), the fifth letter of many Semitic alphabets
 Heiltsuk-Oowekyala language, spoken in Canada

Places 
 Heilongjiang, a province of China
 Hei District, Chiba, a former administrative unit of Japan
 Hei Glacier, in Antarctica
 Hei River, in China
 Heide–Büsum Airport, in Schleswig-Holstein, Germany
 Heighington railway station, in England

In science and technology
 Healthy Eating Index, a measure of diet quality
 High-efficiency incandescent, a type of incandescent light bulb
 High energy ignition, an automotive ignition system
 High explosive incendiary, a type of ammunition
 Hot-carrier injection, a principle in the function of solid-state electronic devices
 Human-environment interaction, or Environmental sociology

Other uses
 Hei (album), 2015 album by Norwegian duo Marcus & Martinus
 Hei (Darker than Black), protagonist of the 2007 anime
 Qi, in traditional Chinese culture, a principle forming part of any living thing (Cantonese: hei)

See also
 Hiei (disambiguation)